The Collection is a compilation album by South African trumpeter Hugh Masekela. It was released on 7 October 2003 via Spectrum Music label.

Track listing

References

External links

2003 compilation albums
Hugh Masekela albums